A list of notable Czech actresses.

A
Monika Absolonová
Zlata Adamovská
Jaroslava Adamová
Jana Andrsová

B
Lída Baarová
Zdeňka Baldová
Eliška Balzerová
Tereza Bebarová
Lucie Bílá
Iva Bittová
Dagmar Bláhová
Mahulena Bočanová
Jiřina Bohdalová
Blanka Bohdanová
Magdaléna Borová
Hana Brejchová
Jana Brejchová
Edita Brychta
Terezie Brzková
Slávka Budínová
Zuzana Bydžovská
Petra Bryant

C
Andrea Černá
Soňa Červená
Vlasta Chramostová
Miriam Chytilová
Ivana Chýlková
Jitka Čvančarová

D
Jana Dítětová
Marie Doležalová
Michaela Dolinová
Milena Dvorská

F
Vlasta Fabianová
Květa Fialová
Táňa Fischerová
Veronika Freimanová
Vera Fusek

G
Věra Galatíková
Anna Geislerová
Nataša Gollová
Truda Grosslichtová
Yana Gupta

H
Štěpánka Haničincová
Dagmar Havlová
Antonie Hegerlíková
Hana Hegerová
Zdena Herfortová
Jana Hlaváčová
Ivana Hloužková
Kateřina Holánová
Hana Holišová
Eva Holubová
Eva Hudečková

I
Klára Issová
Martha Issová

J
Zorka Janů
Iva Janžurová
Klára Jerneková
Jiřina Jirásková
Eva Josefíková

K
Zita Kabátová
Miriam Kantorková
Zora Kerova
Eva Klepáčová
Barbora Kodetová
Daniela Kolářová
Naďa Konvalinková
Jana Krausová
Věra Kubánková

L
Kristýna Leichtová
Anna Linhartová
Olga Lounová

M
Adina Mandlová
Suzanne Marwille
Taťjana Medvecká
Dana Medřická
Jitka Moučková
Míla Myslíková

N
 Růžena Nasková
 Antonie Nedošinská
 Jarmila Novotná

O
 Jaroslava Obermaierová

P
Dagmar Patrasová
Tereza Pergnerová
Jiřina Petrovická
Lenka Pichlíková-Burke
Marie Pilátová
Simona Postlerová
Jana Preissová

R
Irma Reichová
Zora Rozsypalová
Helena Růžičková
Linda Rybová

S
Libuše Šafránková
Olga Scheinpflugová
Olga Schoberová
Jiřina Šejbalová
Alena Šeredová
Lola Skrbková
Růžena Šlemrová
Petra Špalková
Jiřina Steimarová
Jiřina Štěpničková
Jarmila Šuláková
Jana Švandová
Jiřina Švorcová
Libuše Švormová
Dana Syslová

T
Věra Tichánková
Pavla Tomicová
Jiřina Třebická
Lucie Trmíková
Eva Turnová

U
Ivana Uhlířová

V
Hana Vagnerová
Marta Vančurová
Dana Vávrová
Zuzana Vejvodová
Zora Vesecká
Tatiana Vilhelmová
Hana Vítová
Lenka Vlasáková
Helena Vondráčková
Lucie Vondráčková
Tereza Voříšková

W
Blanka Waleská
Kateřina Winterová

Z
Lucie Žáčková
Hana Zagorová
Lucie Žáčková
Stella Zázvorková
Lucie Zedníčková
Jitka Zelenohorská

 
Actresses
Actresses
Czech